Elipsocidae is a family of Psocodea (formerly Psocoptera) belonging to the infraorder Homilopsocidea. Members of the family have a free areola postica. Many species are apterous (without wings). The family includes about 130 species in more than 30 genera.

Genera
These 32 genera belong to the family Elipsocidae:

 Antarctopsocus c g
 Ausysium c g
 Clinopsocus c g
 Cuneopalpus Badonnel, 1943 i c g b
 Diademadrilus c g
 Drymopsocus Smithers, 1963 c g
 Elipsocus Hagen, 1866 i c g b
 Euryphallus c g
 Gondwanapsocus c g
 Hemineura c g
 Kilauella c g
 Metelipsocus c g
 Nepiomorpha Pearman, 1936 i c g
 Nothopsocus c g
 Onychophallus c g
 Paedomorpha c g
 Palistreptus c g
 Palmicola Mockford, 1955 i c g
 Pentacladus c g
 Prionotodrilus c g
 Propsocus McLachlan, 1866 i c g b
 Pseudopsocus c g
 Psocophloea c g
 Reuterella Enderlein, 1903 i c g b
 Roesleria c g
 Sandrapsocus c g
 Sinelipsocus c g
 Spilopsocus c g
 Telmopsocus c g
 Villopsocus c g
 Weddellopsocus c g
 Yuntapsocus c g

Data sources: i = ITIS, c = Catalogue of Life, g = GBIF, b = Bugguide.net

Sources 

 Lienhard, C. & Smithers, C. N. 2002. Psocoptera (Insecta): World Catalogue and Bibliography. Instrumenta Biodiversitatis, vol. 5. Muséum d'histoire naturelle, Genève.

External links

 
Psocoptera families